The discography of Hed PE, an American punk rock band, consists of twelve studio albums, one live album, three compilation albums, four extended plays, seventeen singles, and fourteen music videos.

Formed in Huntington Beach, California in 1994, the band performs a style of music which they refer to as "G-punk". Their music is primarily based in a fusion of punk rock and hip hop music, but they have also incorporated heavy metal and reggae influences. After releasing three albums on Jive Records, Hed PE left the label to record independently, eventually signing with Suburban Noize Records in 2006.  They subsequently signed to the label Pavement, and released the album Evolution on July 22, 2014.

Albums

Studio albums

Live albums

Compilation albums

Extended plays

Singles

As lead artist

As featured artist

Other charted songs

Music videos

Other appearances

References

Punk rock group discographies
Rap rock discographies
Discographies of American artists